The results of the 2011 Little League World Series were determined between August 18 and August 28, 2011 in South Williamsport, Pennsylvania. 16 teams were divided into two groups, one with eight teams from the United States and another with eight international teams, with both groups playing a modified double-elimination tournament. In each group, the last remaining undefeated team faced the last remaining team with one loss, with the winners of those games advancing to play for the Little League World Series championship. All times shown are US EDT.

Double-elimination stage

United States

Winner's bracket

Game 2: Montana 6, South Dakota 4

Game 4: Louisiana 2, Georgia 0

Game 6: California 11, Rhode Island 0

Game 7: Kentucky 1, Pennsylvania 0

Game 14: Montana 3, Louisiana 1

Game 15: California 10, Kentucky 0

Game 24: Montana 1, California 0

Loser's bracket

Game 10: Georgia 6, South Dakota 3

Game 12: Pennsylvania 2, Rhode Island 0

Game 18: Pennsylvania 10, Louisiana 0

Game 20: Georgia 8, Kentucky 5

Game 22: Pennsylvania 7, Georgia 5

Game 26: California 2, Pennsylvania 0

International

Winner's bracket

Game 1: Mexico 3, Chinese Taipei 0

Game 3: Japan 12, Aruba 1

Game 5: Canada 6, Saudi Arabia 5

Game 8: Venezuela 6, Netherlands 1

Game 13: Venezuela 8, Canada 0

Game 16: Mexico 3, Japan 2

Game 23: Mexico 2, Venezuela 1

Loser's bracket

Game 9: Chinese Taipei 20, Aruba 3

Game 11: Saudi Arabia 4, Netherlands 2

Game 17: Canada 5, Chinese Taipei 3

Game 19: Japan 13, Saudi Arabia 4

Game 21: Japan 4, Canada 0

Game 25: Japan 9, Venezuela 6

Crossover games

Game A: Aruba 5, South Dakota 0

Game B: Rhode Island 8, Netherlands 7

Single-elimination stage

International championship: Japan 5, Mexico 2

United States championship: California 11, Montana 2

Consolation game
Due to the impending arrival of Hurricane Irene to the East Coast,the consolation game was cancelled.

World championship: California 2, Japan 1

Notes
1. Ultimately, the game drew a crowd announced by Little League as 41,848, an all-time record for the LLWS.

References

External links
Full schedule from littleleague.org

2011 Little League World Series